Blue toe syndrome is a situation that may reflect atherothrombotic microembolism, causing transient focal ischaemia, occasionally with minor apparent tissue loss, but without diffuse forefoot ischemia. The development of blue or violaceous toes can also occur with trauma, cold-induced injury, disorders producing generalized cyanosis, decreased arterial flow, impaired venous outflow, and abnormal circulating blood. The terms "blue toe syndrome", "grey toe syndrome" and "purple toe syndrome" are sometimes used interchangeably.

Studies may include echocardiography, thoracic and abdominal CT or MRI, peripheral arterial run off imaging studies, hypercoagulopathy labs, and interrogation of syndromes that lead to peripheral vascular pathology.

See also
 Warfarin#Purple toe syndrome
 Cholesterol embolism

References

External links
 Pictures are available on this link. 'Blue toe syndrome'

Foot diseases
Ischemia
Syndromes affecting the cardiovascular system